Scribblenauts Remix is an emergent action puzzle title developed by 5th Cell and Iron Galaxy Studios and published by Warner Bros. Interactive on October 12, 2011. The game provides forty levels from both Scribblenauts and its sequel, Super Scribblenauts along with ten new levels for iOS and Android.  The mechanics of the game are based on Super Scribblenauts, allowing for the use of adjectives in addition to nouns. The game uses built-in features of iOS, such as the touch keyboard, and was released simultaneously with iOS version 5, incorporating new features such as cloud storage via iCloud to play the game across multiple devices. The game also features Game Center integration.

As a result of a price drop to approximately one dollar, Scribblenauts Remix took the top sales spot for iOS games during the week of November 14, 2011, knocking long-term favorite Angry Birds from this spot. By February 2012, it had gained more than one million downloads, and in honor of that it was updated with a Valentine's playground.

Reception

References

5th Cell games
2011 video games
Android (operating system) games
IOS games
Puzzle video games
Remix
Video games developed in the United States
Warner Bros. video games
Iron Galaxy games
Single-player video games